The Big Cedar School in Idaho County, Idaho near Kooskia, Idaho was listed on the National Register of Historic Places in 2016.

References

School buildings on the National Register of Historic Places in Idaho
School buildings completed in 1906
Valley County, Idaho
Schools in Idaho
1906 establishments in Idaho